The Enfield–Suffield Covered Bridge was a wooden covered bridge over the Connecticut River located between Enfield, Connecticut, and Suffield, Connecticut.  This bridge connected Bridge Lane on the Enfield (east) side of the river with the west side of the river, where Bridge Street met it. There is now a parallel row of trees on this west side of the river where the street once ran.

History 

Half of this bridge was destroyed in a flood on 2 February 1900.  Hosea Keach, agent for the railroad at Bridge Lane Station, which was at the entrance to the bridge, was on the bridge when it collapsed.  He rode the span down the river, and climbed to the roof, where he was seen by two railroad employees at the Warehouse Point bridge, Arthur Blodgett and R. A. Abbe.  They lowered a rope from the railroad bridge as he passed below, rescuing him.

The remains of the bridge were purchased by Southern New England Telephone, which blew up the remaining part of the bridge and used the piers for carrying telephone wires across the river.

See also 
 List of crossings of the Connecticut River

References

Covered bridges in Connecticut
Bridges over the Connecticut River
Bridge disasters in the United States
Bridges completed in 1832
Wooden bridges in Connecticut
Bridges in Hartford County, Connecticut
Road bridges in Connecticut
Transportation disasters in Connecticut
Former toll bridges in Connecticut